A surgical instrument is a tool or device for performing specific actions or carrying out desired effects during a surgery or operation, such as modifying biological tissue, or to provide access for viewing it. Over time, many different kinds of surgical instruments and tools have been invented. Some surgical instruments are designed for general use in all sorts of surgeries, while others are designed for only certain specialties or specific procedures. 

Classification of surgical instruments helps surgeons to understand the functions and purposes of the instruments. With the goal of optimizing surgical results and performing more difficult operations, more instruments continue to be invented in the modern era.

History 
Many different kinds of surgical instruments and tools have been invented and some have been repurposed as medical knowledge and surgical practices have developed. As surgery practice diversified, some tools are advanced for higher accuracy and stability while some are invented with the completion of medical and scientific knowledge.

Two waves in history contributed significantly to the development of surgical tools.

In the 1900s, inventions of aseptic surgeries (maintenance of sterile conditions through good hygiene procedures) on the basis of existing antiseptic surgeries (sterilization of tools before, during, and after surgery) led to the manifestations of sale and use of instrument sterilizers, sterile gauze, and cotton.  Most importantly,  instruments were advanced to be readily and effectively sterilized by replacing wooden and ivory handles with metals. For safety and comfort concerns, the tools are made with as few pieces as possible.

Hand surgery emerged as a specialty during World War II, and the tools used by early hand surgeons remain in common use today, and many are identified by the names of those who created them.

Individual tools have diverse history development. Below is a brief history of the inventors and tools created for five commonly used surgical tools.

Scissors 

 Mayo scissors, created by one of the mayo brothers, was one of the inventions of the Mayo clinic (established by Dr.William Worrall Mayo and his two sons, Dr. William James Mayo and Dr. Charles Horace Mayo in the 1880s). Mayo scissors have semi-blunt ends and they are either straight or curve-bladed. The straight blades are used for cutting tissue near wounds, and curves are used for cutting thick tissue.
 Metzenbaum scissors were invented by Myron Metzenbaum (1876-1944). This tool was widely used for tonsillectomy (the surgical removal of the tonsils). The lighter and longer handle allows it to be used in tighter operating fields.

Knife to scalpel to electrocautery 

 Primitive knives were made of perishable materials such as sharp leaf margins or bamboo. After the Dark Ages, Muslims, and later European countries started to develop surgical instruments, scalpels, for cutting.
 In 1904, King Gillette developed a double-edged safety razor blade with a disposable blade. After 10 years, Morgan Parker, an engineer, developed and patented another type of disposable scalpel, consisting of an overlapping blade locked into a metal handle that allows for easily replacing dull and used blades with fresh sterile blades. Compared to the Gillette ones, this new blade provides stability whilst still being able to exchange blades between uses.
 Despite the knowledge that heat can control bleeding since the sixth-century BC, it was not until the 18th-century that people started to use electricity to generate heat for cautery. William Stewart Halsted was the pioneer of the technique, which later was called Diathermy.
 In 1900, physician Joseph Rivière used electrical current to treat a benign carcinomatous ulcer on the dorsum of his patient's hand. Then in 1907, Physician Karl Franz Nagelschmidt used diathermy to treat lesions as well as the coagulation of vascular tumors and hemorrhoids.
 In the early 1900s, William T. Bovie proposed the use of different current (flow of electrical charge of the carrier) for cutting and coagulation. Bovie collaborated with Dr. Harvey Cushing, which led to the birth of “Bovie”, a diathermy apparatus. It allows for careful dissection of tissue while maintaining hemostasis.

Retractors 

 During the Renaissance, retractors were lacking so the surgeons uses their fingers to supply the necessary retraction of tissue exploration. Albucasis, a pioneer of modern medicine, devised numerous hooks for surgical retraction including circumcisions, tracheostomies, hemorrhoidectomies, and central extractions in his famous book Al Tasreef Liman ‘Ajaz ‘Aan Al-Taleef around 1000 AD.
 In the 19th century, Doyen abdominal retractors were invented by French surgeon Eugène-Louis Doyen. The doyen retractors are auto-static, self-retaining retractors that are used primarily in abdominal OB/GYN procedures. It facilitates the completion of difficult surgeries by providing improved exposure.
 In the late 19th century, Nicholas Senn, an early adopter of Listerism, felt that having a smooth surface on a surgical instrument was important to help to prevent infection. Thus, he developed what is now called the Senn retractor, a double-ended retractor with an end of three bent prongs that may be dull or sharp, and it was often used in plastic or vascular surgery procedures.
 The Weitlaner retractor, invented by Franz Weitlaner in 1905, is a self-retaining, finger ring retractor with a cam ratchet lock used for holding back tissue and exposing a surgical site that allows the surgeon to activate using a single hand. His invention inspired the invention of more retractors, such as Adson-Beckman retractors for general surgery and Chung retractors for orthopedic surgery.

Forceps 

 Back in the 6th century BC, laboring caused a high mortality rate for both mothers and newborns due to the hours or days of the lasting delivery process. This problem led to the establishment of forceps-assisted delivery in the 16th century by the Chamberlen family. Forceps were later developed over several centuries by leading obstetricians of the time including James Simpson, Neville Barnes, and Christian Kielland.
 Michael Ellis DeBakey invented one of the most common and well-known DeBkey forceps. The vascular atraumatic forceps (DeBakey)were widely used for grasping vascular tissue and causing minimal damage to the vessels. This invention led to the development of the Dacron aortic graft for the repair of aortic aneurysms.
 Around the mid 1900s, Alfred Washington Adson, a pioneer in neuroscience at Mayo Clinic, invented Adson forceps that allows the lifting and removal of neural tissue.

Hemostat/clamp 

 Hemostats are forceps that aim to obliterate the lumen of vessels and to obtain adherence to the crushed surfaces and vascular hemostasis. Originally, this notion of crushing did not exist and arterial catch forceps simply clamped vessels temporarily prior to ligature or cautery.
 In 1867, Eugene Koeberle, who accidentally found arterial forceps with a catch closure came away spontaneously without the need for ligature, and invented “pince hémostatique,” which have pin and hole catches. 
 In 1882, the Kocher clamp was created by Emil Theodor Kocher, who significantly contributed to thyroidectomies (removal of all or a part of the thyroid gland) and decompressive craniotomy. This invention decreases the risk of contamination while cutting dense tissue.
 Later, Dr. William Henry Welch and William Stewart Halsted contributed to the invention of clamps and Halsted-Mosquito Hemostats, which were used to clamp small blood vessels. Kelly clamp, invented by Howard Kelly, has similar functions but it can clamp larger vessels due to the slightly larger jaw.

Accordingly, the nomenclature of surgical instruments follows certain patterns, such as a description of the action it performs (for example, scalpel, hemostat), the name of its inventor(s) (for example, the Kocher forceps), or a compound scientific name related to the kind of surgery (for example, a tracheotomy is a tool used to perform a tracheotomy).

Classification 
There are several classes of surgical instruments:
 Graspers, such as forceps (non-locking forceps/ grasping forceps, thumb forceps, pick-ups) 
 Used for tissue or object grasping. Forceps are categorized into toothed or non-toothed at the tip. (e.g.,Tissue forceps, Adson forceps, Bonney forceps, DeBakey forceps, Russian forceps) 
 Clamps (locking forceps)
 Clamps stabilize or hold tissue and objects in place. They can be used for traumatic or atraumatic purposes. (e.g., Crile hemostat, Kelly clamp, Kocher clamp)
 Surgical scissors
 Tool for tissue cutting, dissection, and suture. Straight and curved scissors are used for cutting different structures. (e.g. Mayo scissors, Metzenbaum scissors, Pott’s scissors, Iris Scissors).
 Bone cutters: unpowered or powered saws, drills and pliers-like devices
 Needles/Sutures
 Tools used for suturing dissection sites or closing cuts. Needles have different shapes (e.g. j shape, ½ circle, straight) and cutting edges (tapered - round, conventional cutting - triangular) depending on the application and areas of the suture. Sutures can be categorized based on different sizes (e.g.#5-#11, higher numbers represent larger suture diameter) and types (absorbable and nonabsorbable and braided and non-braided) as well.
 Needle drivers(needle holders)
 Tools used to hold suture needle while it is passed through tissue and to grasp suture while instrument knot tying.
 Retractors, used to spread open skin, ribs and other tissue
 Tools for various purposes depending on the condition. Retractors can be used to expose incision openings, hold tissue back, or maintain operating areas. They can be categorized into either hand-held retractors or self-retaining ones (via a ratcheting mechanism) (e.g., Deaver retractor, Weitlaner retractor, Malleable Retractor).
 Distractors, positioners and stereotactic devices
 Mechanical cutters (scalpels, lancets, trocars, Harmonic scalpel, rongeurs etc.)
 Dilators and specula, for access to narrow passages or incisions
 Suction tips and tubes, for removal of bodily fluids
 Tools used to remove secretion, debris, or any fluid in the surgical area. (e.g. Yankauer Suction Tube, Poole Suction Tube, Frazier Suction Tip)
 Sealing devices, such as surgical staplers
 Tools used for resection (Removing part of an organ), transaction (Cutting through and sealing organs and tissues), and anastomoses (Creating connections between structures). (e.g. linear stapler, linear cutter, clips)
 Irrigation and injection needles, tips and tubes, for introducing fluid
 Powered devices, such as cranial drills and dermatomes
 Scopes and probes, including fiber optic endoscopes and tactile probes
 Carriers and appliers for optical, electronic, and mechanical devices
 Ultrasound tissue disruptors, cryotomes and cutting laser guides
 Measurement devices, such as rulers and calipers
 Energy systems tools are used to cut tissues or seal vessels 
 Electrosurgery is a modern technology that uses high frequency electrical current to cut or coagulate blood. 
 Argon plasma coagulation involves the application of gas discharges in argon. 
 Ultrasound surgery uses high frequency and high energy sound waves to target and destroy tissue.
 LigaSure fuses vessels up to 7mm in diameter in an efficient manner.

Terminology 
The expression surgical instrumentation is somewhat interchangeably used with surgical instruments, but its meaning in medical jargon is the activity of providing assistance to a surgeon with the proper handling of surgical instruments during an operation, by a specialized professional, usually a surgical technologist or sometimes a nurse or radiographer.

An important relative distinction regarding surgical instruments is the amount of bodily disruption or tissue trauma that their use might cause the patient. Terms relating to this issue are 'atraumatic' and minimally invasive.

See also

 Instruments used in general surgery
 Medical instruments and implants

Gallery

References

External links
Edgar R. McGuire Historical Medical Instrument Collection from the University at Buffalo Libraries

Bibliography
 Wells, MP, Bradley, M: Surgical Instruments A Pocket Guide. W.B. Saunders, 1998.